Kadkan (also known as Katkan) is a city and capital of Kadkan District, in Torbat-e Heydarieh County, Razavi Khorasan Province, Iran. At the 2006 census, its population was 3,166, in 840 families.

References 

Populated places in Torbat-e Heydarieh County
Cities in Razavi Khorasan Province